Parrella is a genus of gobies native to the tropical waters of the Pacific and Atlantic coasts of the Americas. The name of this genus honours the Norwegian American marine biologist, zoologist and oceanographer Albert Eide Parr (1900-1991).

Species
There are currently five recognized species in this genus:
 Parrella fusca Ginsburg, 1939
 Parrella ginsburgi Wade, 1946 (Darkblotch goby)
 Parrella lucretiae (C. H. Eigenmann & R. S. Eigenmann, 1888) (Lucretia's goby)
 Parrella macropteryx Ginsburg, 1939
 Parrella maxillaris Ginsburg, 1938 (Doublestripe goby)

References

Gobiidae